Qunjia Township (Mandarin: 群加藏族乡) is a township in Huangzhong District, Xining, Qinghai, China. In 2010, Qunjia Township had a total population of 2,151: 1,074 males and 1,077 females: 471 aged under 14, 1,529 aged between 15 and 65 and 151 aged over 65.

References 

Xining
Township-level divisions of Qinghai
Ethnic townships of the People's Republic of China